Patrera is a genus of anyphaenid sac spiders first described by Eugène Simon in 1903.

Species
 it contains forty-eight species:

Patrera anchicaya Martínez, Brescovit, Villarreal & Oliveira, 2021 – Colombia
Patrera apora (Chamberlin, 1916) – Peru
Patrera armata (Chickering, 1940) – Panama, Colombia, Guyana, Brazil
Patrera auricoma (L. Koch, 1866) – Colombia
Patrera barbacoas Martínez, Brescovit, Villarreal & Oliveira, 2021 – Colombia
Patrera bonaldoi Martínez, Brescovit, Villarreal & Oliveira, 2021 – Colombia
Patrera borjai Martínez, Brescovit, Villarreal & Oliveira, 2021 – Colombia
Patrera boteroi Martínez, Brescovit, Villarreal & Oliveira, 2021 – Colombia
Patrera carvalhoi Martínez, Brescovit, Villarreal & Oliveira, 2021 – Colombia
Patrera chucurui Martínez, Brescovit, Villarreal & Oliveira, 2021 – Colombia
Patrera cita (Keyserling, 1891) – Brazil
Patrera concolor (Keyserling, 1891) – Brazil
Patrera danielae Martínez, Brescovit, Villarreal & Oliveira, 2021 – Colombia
Patrera dawkinsi Martínez, Brescovit, Villarreal & Oliveira, 2021 – Colombia
Patrera dentata Martínez, Brescovit, Villarreal & Oliveira, 2021 – Colombia
Patrera dimar Martínez, Brescovit, Villarreal & Oliveira, 2021 – Colombia
Patrera dracula Martínez, Brescovit, Villarreal & Oliveira, 2021 – Colombia
Patrera florezi Martínez, Brescovit, Villarreal & Oliveira, 2021 – Colombia
Patrera fulvastra Simon, 1903 – Colombia, Ecuador
Patrera hatunkiru Dupérré & Tapia, 2016 – Ecuador
Patrera kuryi Martínez, Brescovit, Villarreal & Oliveira, 2021 – Colombia
Patrera lauta (Chickering, 1940) – Panama
Patrera longipes (Keyserling, 1891) – Brazil, Argentina
Patrera longitibialis Martínez, Brescovit, Villarreal & Oliveira, 2021 – Colombia
Patrera opertanea (Keyserling, 1891) – Brazil
Patrera pellucida (Keyserling, 1891) – Brazil
Patrera perafani Martínez, Brescovit, Villarreal & Oliveira, 2021 – Colombia
Patrera perijaensis Martínez, Brescovit, Villarreal & Oliveira, 2021 – Colombia
Patrera philipi Dupérré & Tapia, 2016 – Ecuador
Patrera platnicki Martínez, Brescovit, Villarreal & Oliveira, 2021 – Colombia
Patrera procera (Keyserling, 1891) – Brazil, Paraguay, Argentina
Patrera puta (O. Pickard-Cambridge, 1896) – Costa Rica
Patrera quillacinga Martínez, Brescovit, Villarreal & Oliveira, 2021 – Colombia
Patrera quimbaya Martínez, Brescovit, Villarreal & Oliveira, 2021 – Colombia
Patrera ramirezi Martínez, Brescovit, Villarreal & Oliveira, 2021 – Colombia
Patrera recentissima (Keyserling, 1891) – Brazil
Patrera rubra (F. O. Pickard-Cambridge, 1900) – Guatemala, Costa Rica, Colombia, Ecuador
Patrera sampedroi Martínez, Brescovit, Villarreal & Oliveira, 2021 – Colombia
Patrera shida Dupérré & Tapia, 2016 – Ecuador
Patrera stylifer (F. O. Pickard-Cambridge, 1900) – Panama
Patrera suni Dupérré & Tapia, 2016 – Ecuador
Patrera tensa (Keyserling, 1891) – Brazil
Patrera teresopolis Oliveira & Brescovit, 2021 – Brazil
Patrera virgata (Keyserling, 1891) – Brazil
Patrera witsu Dupérré & Tapia, 2016 – Ecuador
Patrera wiwa Martínez, Brescovit, Villarreal & Oliveira, 2021 – Colombia
Patrera yukpa Martínez, Brescovit, Villarreal & Oliveira, 2021 – Colombia

References

Anyphaenidae
Araneomorphae genera
Spiders of Central America
Spiders of South America
Taxa named by Eugène Simon